Gabriella Doueihy (born 30 April 1999) is a Lebanese swimmer. She competed in the first round of the women's 400 metre freestyle event at the 2016 Summer Olympics, coming in 31st, and in the first round of the women's 200 metre freestyle event at the 2020 Summer Olympics, finishing 29th. Additionally, Gabriella has competed in six World Championships, including the 2022 FINA World Swimming Championships (25m). Gabriella holds multiple national records in the 400m, 800m, and 1500m freestyle.

2016 Summer Olympics

References

External links
 

1999 births
Living people
Lebanese female swimmers
Olympic swimmers of Lebanon
Swimmers at the 2016 Summer Olympics
Place of birth missing (living people)
Swimmers at the 2018 Mediterranean Games
Swimmers at the 2014 Asian Games
Swimmers at the 2018 Asian Games
Asian Games competitors for Lebanon
Lebanese female freestyle swimmers
Mediterranean Games competitors for Lebanon
Swimmers at the 2020 Summer Olympics
21st-century Lebanese women
People from Zgharta District